Dhruv Vikram (born 23 September 1997) is an Indian actor, singer and lyricist who works in Tamil films. The son of actor Vikram, he made his acting debut with the 2019 romantic drama Adithya Varma and has since starred with his father in Mahaan (2022).

Early life 
Dhruv was born on 23 September 1995 in Chennai as the son of actor Vikram and his wife Shailaja. His elder sister Akshitha is married to Manu Ranjith, who is the great-grandson of politician M. Karunanidhi. His grandfather Vinod Raj was also an actor who acted in a few Tamil films.

Career 
Dhruv had been first approached to play a role in Mohan Raja's M. Kumaran Son of Mahalakshmi (2004), but eventually did not feature. Pandiraj later approached him to play the role of Anbukkarasu in Pasanga (2008); however, Vikram was then not keen on letting his son get into acting and the role subsequently went to Kishore DS. A short film titled "Good Night Charlie" directed by Dhruv based on child abuse was released in 2016 on YouTube.

Dhruv was to have made his feature film debut with Bala's Varmaa, a remake of the Telugu film Arjun Reddy (2017); however, the release of the film was stalled after the producer was not content about the final product. The film was relaunched as Adithya Varma, directed by Gireesaaya, with Dhruv continuing his role, and released in 2019 with M. Suganth of The Times of India noting that "Dhruv Vikram comes up with a performance that captures Vijay Deverakonda's intense and raw act from the original note for note, but there is an assuredness and honesty here that makes us appreciate it rather than dismiss it just as mimicry". Varmaa had a delayed release in 2020 and Suganth stated that "As for Dhruv Vikram, he is rawer here, looking sure-footed in some scenes and like a novice in some". Dhruv acted alongside his father in the latter's 60th film, Mahaan which was released on 10 February 2022 on Amazon Prime Video. He also wrote and sang a song named "Missing Me" for the film. Dhruv later wrote, sang and directed the music video of "Manase", composed by Ujwal Gupta. Dhruv is signed up for an untitled film to be directed by Mari Selvaraj.

Filmography

Discography

Accolades

References

External links 
 

1995 births
21st-century Indian male actors
Indian male film actors
Living people
Male actors from Chennai
Male actors in Tamil cinema
Tamil male actors